Kendall is the name of some places in the U.S. state of Wisconsin:
Kendall, Lafayette County, Wisconsin, a town
Kendall, Monroe County, Wisconsin, a village